Underneath the Colours is the second studio album by Australian rock band INXS. It was released in Australia in 19 October 1981 on the Deluxe Records label and reached No 15 on the Australian album charts.

Background
In 1981, INXS signed Gary Grant as their tour manager, who then became co-manager a year later. Between touring commitments, the band released their third single in May 1981, "The Loved One", which was a cover of a 1966 song by Australian group The Loved Ones. The song was recorded at Studios 301 in Sydney, produced by Richard Clapton, and peaked in the Top 20.

The success of the single led to Clapton and the band returning to Studios 301 between July and August 1981 to create their second studio album. The album was released on 19 October 1981 and became a hit in Australia peaking at No. 15.

It was with this album that Michael Hutchence's songwriting started to mature and the band started to find a unique sound. Included were political songs and their very first ballad. It was released outside Australia and New Zealand in 1984, as the band were gaining momentum in their success.

Kirk Pengilly said of the album, "It was very difficult for us. We'd toured the first album and then we had to come up with a follow up. We weren't really prepared for it and I think the album suffered a bit because of that." Alternately, Hutchence said he was very happy with the album: "The first album was a cheapie, but with this one we had time to spend. We had Richard Clapton producing and he was a big help. We looked at things from a straight studio perspective."

The first single from the album was "Stay Young" in October, which reached No 21 on the Australian Singles chart in November, it was followed by "Night of Rebellion" in January 1982. In July 1982 INXS signed a new deal with WEA Australia for releases in Australia, South East Asia, Japan and New Zealand; with sister label Atco Records (a subsidiary of Atlantic Records) for North America and with PolyGram for United Kingdom and the rest of Europe.

The cover is an uncredited linocut by British artist Cyril Power titled Folk Dance.

Track listing

Personnel 
INXS
 Michael Hutchence – vocals
 Andrew Farriss – keyboards
 Tim Farriss – guitars
 Kirk Pengilly – guitars, saxophone, vocals
 Garry Gary Beers – bass, vocals
 Jon Farriss – drums, percussion, vocals

Additional musicians
 Keith Casey – percussion (3, 10)
 Karen Ansel – backing vocals (1, 3)
 Dave Mason – backing vocals (1, 3)

Production 
 INXS – arrangements 
 Richard Clapton – producer
 Alex Vertikoff – engineer 
 David Walsh – second engineer 
 Paul Ibbotson – mastering at Festival Studios (Sydney, Australia)
 Art '79 – front cover artwork 
 Garry Gary Beers – photography 
 Jon Farriss – photography
 Tim Farriss – photography

Charts

Notes

INXS albums
1981 albums